Russell J. Schriefer is an American political strategist and media consultant who has worked on six out of the last seven presidential campaigns.  In 2012, he was a senior advisor and media consultant on Governor Mitt Romney’s presidential campaign.

In 2018, Schriefer was the lead strategist and media consultant that helped re-elect Governor Larry Hogan. Hogan became the first Republican to be re-elected Governor in Maryland since 1954 and only the second Republican in the state's history.

In 2014 Schriefer helped elect: Governor Larry Hogan, Governor Asa Hutchinson, Governor Mary Fallin, Congresswoman Elise Stefanik, Congressman Michael Grimm, and Attorney General Sam Olens.

In 2009 & 2013 Schriefer was the media consultant for Governor Chris Christie's campaign for governor in New Jersey.

After graduating from Manhattan College, Schriefer got his start working for two Republican House members, and was Mid-Atlantic political director for George H. W. Bush in the 1988 campaign. He briefly became a lobbyist, but he soured on the profession after being asked to defend a product that harmed wildlife. He then managed Rudolph W. Giuliani's unsuccessful New York mayoral campaign in 1989. During the 1996 presidential primary season, Schriefer did consulting work for Robert J. Dole for president.

As a founding partner with Stuart Stevens and Ashley O'Connor in Strategic Partners & Media, Schriefer has worked with many Republican governors, senators, and Congressmen, including Governor Robert Ehrlich (MD), Senator Johnny Isakson (GA), Governor Tom Ridge (PA), Governor Bill Weld (MA), Governor Paul Cellucci (MA), Governor Bob Riley (AL), Governor Charlie Crist (FL), Senator Richard Lugar (IN), Senator John Cornyn (TX), Governor Mary Fallin (OK), Senator Dan Coats (IN), Senator Roy Blunt (MO) and Senator Rob Portman (OH).  He served as program director of the 2004 & 2012 Republican conventions.

Schriefer produced campaign advertisements for George W. Bush in the 2000 and 2004 elections, gaining notoriety for an advertisement that aired in 2004 picturing Senator John Kerry windsurfing. In 2007, Stevens & Schriefer briefly served as one of Senator John McCain's media consultants.

Schriefer also does corporate consulting.

Russ lives in Chevy Chase, Maryland, with his wife, former journalist, author, and CO-CEO of Sellers Easton Media, Nina Easton, and their daughter, Ellie.

References

External links
 
  Schriefer at The Washington Post
  Schriefer on New York Times
  USA Today
  Schriefer on abc news
  Strategic Partners & Media
  Russ Schriefer Bio - Strategic Partners & Media

Living people
American political consultants
Year of birth missing (living people)
Manhattan College alumni
Maryland Republicans